Marshall McGuire (born 1965) is an Australian harpist, teacher, conductor and musical administrator. He has been described as the world's greatest champion of new music for the harp.

Biography
McGuire was born in Melbourne in 1965. His interest in the harp was sparked when he saw Harpo Marx playing the instrument in the film A Night at the Opera. He was taught by Huw Jones, harpist with the Melbourne Symphony Orchestra. He studied at VCASS, the Victorian College of the Arts, in Paris with Marie-Claire Jamet and the Royal College of Music, London. Since July 2015, he has been director of programming at the Melbourne Recital Centre.

From 1988 to 1992, he was principal harpist with the Australian Opera and Ballet Orchestra. He has been a member of the ELISION Ensemble since 1988 and was lecturer in Harp at the Sydney Conservatorium of Music.

He has performed as soloist with the Australian Chamber Orchestra, English String Orchestra, Les Talens Lyriques, Australian Brandenburg Orchestra, Melbourne Symphony Orchestra and the Australia Ensemble and has appeared at international festivals including Aldeburgh, Melbourne, Milan, Geneva, Brighton, Vienna, Huddersfield, Huntington and Adelaide.

He has commissioned and premiered more than 100 new works for harp, this achievement was recognised by the 1997 Sounds Australian Award for the Most Distinguished Contribution to the Presentation of Australian Music. His commissions include composers such as Michael Finnissy, Elena Kats-Chernin, Andrew Ford, Gerard Brophy, David Chesworth, Damien Ricketson, Matthew Shlomowitz and Matthew Hindson.

Performances and recordings 
First performances by McGuire include works by Ross Edwards, Anne Boyd, Barry Conyngham, Alessandro Solbiati and Liza Lim. Many composers have sought his guidance in their writing for the harp. He writes: "Composers are always seeking information from harpists about what can and can't be done when writing for harp. While we should always be flattered when approached by a composer, we should also be aware of the boundaries that we set, so that we don't end up with unplayable music – I'd probably have said 'No' to both Richard Wagner and Richard Strauss. Mostly, less is more..."

McGuire has released numerous recordings and has received four ARIA Music Award nominations, winning the award for Best Classical Album for Bower (with Genevieve Lacey). Artists with whom he has worked and recorded include Riley Lee (shakuhachi); Patricia Pollett (viola); and Jane Edwards and Merlyn Quaife (sopranos). In 2011 he recorded Eugene Goossens' Concerto Piece for oboe and two harps with the Melbourne Symphony Orchestra, conducted by Sir Andrew Davis, for Chandos.

In 1998, with Lyle Chan, he co-created A Tale of Two Cities, a radio feature broadcast on ABC Classic FM, which was a monologue based on the lives of such gay composers as Ned Rorem, Leonard Bernstein, Samuel Barber, Virgil Thomson, Aaron Copland, Paul Bowles, Francis Poulenc, Stanley Bate and Reynaldo Hahn.

He made his conducting debut in performances of Mozart's The Magic Flute with Pacific Opera in 1999. From 1996 to 2000 he created a series of chamber music concerts for the Sydney Gay and Lesbian Mardi Gras Festival, the first of their type in the world. From 1999 to 2001 he was curator of the Twilight Chamber Music Series for Sydney Festival, and in 2003 he was artist-in-residence at the Bundanon Trust. In 2010 he conducted performances of Purcell's Dido and Aeneas at the Macau International Music Festival.

Artistic direction 
In 2003 he was appointed artistic director of the Seymour Group, and was awarded an inaugural creative fellowship from the State Library Victoria to research the works of Peggy Glanville-Hicks. The fellowship enabled him to produce piano reductions of Glanville-Hicks' Letters from Morocco and the final scene from the opera Sappho, and a new edition of the Sonata for Harp. He received a Churchill Fellowship in 2004 to travel to San Francisco and New York to research baroque performance and contemporary music ensembles.

McGuire is the founding president of the New Music Network; was chair of the music committee of the New South Wales Ministry of the Arts, is a member of the Australian Youth Orchestra Artistic Advisory Committee and was music director of the AYO's National Music Camp in 2003, 2006 and 2008. He was the inaugural curator of the Utzon Music Series from 2006 until 2011 at the Sydney Opera House, and in December 2006 was appointed executive manager, artistic planning, with the West Australian Symphony Orchestra. He was a participant in the Australia 2020 Summit held in April 2008 at Parliament House, Canberra.

In 2018 he was on the selection jury for the ClassicalNEXT conference in Rotterdam, and a jury member for the piano trio section of the  competition in Graz, Austria.

He is artistic co-director of the Australian baroque ensemble Ludovico's Band, specialising in Italian and Spanish works of the 17th century. Previous performances with the band include Monteverdi's Orfeo at the 2007 Queensland Music Festival; J.S. Bach's St John Passion for Melbourne Recital Centre; a baroque triple bill for Victorian Opera; Mozart's The Marriage of Figaro for Victorian Opera; a semi-staged performance of Monteverdi's Eighth Book of Madrigals – Love + the Art of War; and a CD The Italian Ground on ABC Classics.

From 2013 to 2015, he curated, with Richard Tognetti, the Haydn for Everyone series for Melbourne International Arts Festival, programming performances of all 68 string quartets by Joseph Haydn, featuring quartets from Australia and around the world including Debussy Quartet, Modigliani Quartet, Flinders Quartet, Orava Quartet, Quartz, Ironwood, Australian Haydn Ensemble, Australian Chamber Orchestra, and London Haydn Quartet.

In 2020 he curated the Chamber Landscapes series at UKARIA for the Adelaide Festival. Composer + Citizen featured performances by Heath Quartet, Roomful of Teeth, Anthony Marwood, Siobhan Stagg, Ludovico's Band, and the Australian premiere of Lembit Beecher and Hannah Moscovitch's I Have no Stories to Tell You.

Discography

Albums

Awards

AIR Awards
The Australian Independent Record Awards (commonly known informally as AIR Awards) is an annual awards night to recognise, promote and celebrate the success of Australia's Independent Music sector.

! 
|-
| 2022
| Bower (with Genevieve Lacey)
| Best Independent Classical Album or EP
| 
|

ARIA Music Awards
The ARIA Music Awards is an annual awards ceremony that recognises excellence, innovation, and achievement across all genres of Australian music.

! 
|-
| 1996
| Awakening
| ARIA Award for Best Classical Album
| 
|
|-
| 2000
| Spring Sea (with Riley Lee)
| ARIA Award for Best World Music Album
| 
| 
|-
| 2003
| The Twentieth Century Harp
| Best Classical Album
| 
|
|-
| 2021
| Bower (with Genevieve Lacey)
| Best Classical Album
| 
| 
|-
|}

References

External links
 
 
 Profile, Australian Music Centre

1965 births
Living people
Alumni of the Royal College of Music
APRA Award winners
ARIA Award winners
Australian classical harpists
Australian conductors (music)
Australian music educators
Musicians from Melbourne
Australian LGBT musicians
LGBT classical musicians
21st-century conductors (music)